Sahir Hoshiarpuri, born Ram Parkash Sharma was an Urdu poet from India. He wrote several poetry books; his main form was ghazal. Moreover, his several ghazals have been sung by leading singers including Jagjit Singh.

Biography

Early life

Sahir Hoshiarpuri was born on 5 March 1913 and raised in Hoshiarpur, Punjab, India. He received his education at Government College. He earned his M.A degree in Persian in 1935. He was a disciple of Josh Malsiyani who belonged to the Daagh School of Urdu Poetry.
During his college days he came into contact with Mehr Lal Soni Zia Fatehabadi who was studying at Forman Christian College nearby Lahore, their friendship lasted a lifetime. They were both residing in Kanpur. He died on 18 December 1994 in Delhi, India.

Literary career

Sahir Hoshiarpuri and Naresh Kumar Shad also edited and published the Urdu Journal Chandan.

He has written several books but only five published collections of him are available. In 1989 he was given the Ghalib Award by the Ghalib Institute in recognition of his literary contributions.

See also
 List of Urdu language poets

Bibliography
 Jal Tarang
 Sahar e ghazal (1959)
 Sahar e naghma (1970)
 Sahar e haraf (1982)
 Sahar e khayal (1990)
 Nuqoosh e Dagh

References

1913 births
1994 deaths
Hindu poets
Urdu-language poets from India
Indian male poets
People from Hoshiarpur
20th-century Indian poets
Poets from Punjab, India
20th-century Indian male writers